Stylaster nobilis, the noble coral, is a branching colonial hydroid in the family Stylasteridae.

Description

Noble corals are pink or orange and tree-like with paler tips to the colony's branches. The calcareous colonies may grow to over 25 cm in total height, while individual polyps are 0.1 cm in diameter. There is no free medusa stage.

The polyps project from star-shaped cavities in the rigid calcareous skeleton. Growth occurs at the tips and on the outside surface, which gradually thickens and which may show concentric rings in section.

Colour and shape variation

Distribution
This colonial animal is found only off the South African coast from the Atlantic Coast of the Cape  Peninsula to Port Elizabeth in 5-100m of water. It is endemic to this region.

Ecology
Noble corals feed on plankton and resemble hard corals. They occur in cool temperate waters usually in caves and under overhangs. They are very slow-growing: large colonies may be over 100 years old. A permit is required to collect these animals.

Synonyms
The following species are considered synonyms of Stylaster nobilis:
Allopora explanata Kent, 1871
Allopora nobilis Kent, 1871
Allopora ochracea Qulech, 1884

References

Stylasteridae
Animals described in 1921